1993 Space Machine is a 2016 shoot 'em up video game for Microsoft Windows and OS X. The game was originally planned for release as Shenandoah: Daughter of the Stars on the Amiga in 1993 before the project was abandoned.

References

External links

2016 video games
Indie video games
Shoot 'em ups
Multiplayer and single-player video games
Video games developed in Sweden
Windows games
MacOS games